Elizabeth Welsh (3 March 1843 – 13 February 1921) was a classicist and the second longest running Mistress of Girton College, Cambridge.

Life and career
Elizabeth Welsh was born in 1843 in County Down, Ireland to John Welsh and his wife Elizabeth Dalzell. She was the eldest of their four daughters. Welsh was educated first at home, then at various private schools and by the vicar of her parish, who taught her Latin and Greek. In 1872, she went up to Girton College, Cambridge to study Classics. After completing the Tripos in 1875, she taught at Manchester High School, before returning to Girton in 1876 as a tutor in classics.

Welsh became vice-mistress of Girton in 1880 after the Mistress, Marianne Bernard, devolved some of her responsibilities. She succeeded her as Mistress of Girton in 1885, the first person who had studied at Girton to be Mistress. Shortly after her appointment, she was made a member of Girton and elected to the executive committee, becoming the first Mistress to have a say in the government of the college. She held this post until her retirement in 1903. She died in Edinburgh, on 13 February 1921 and was buried in Girton churchyard.

References

1843 births
1921 deaths
Alumni of Girton College, Cambridge
Mistresses of Girton College, Cambridge
People from County Down